Hayley McFarland (born March 29, 1991) is an American actress. She is best known for portraying Emily Lightman in the Fox crime drama series Lie to Me. In the supernatural horror film The Conjuring, McFarland portrayed Nancy Perron.

Early life
Hayley McFarland was born on March 29, 1991, in Edmond, Oklahoma. She began performing in summer musicals at Oklahoma City's Lyric Theatre. While living in Oklahoma, she studied at Michelle De Long's ACTS Acting Academy, which notes fellow alumni such as Ryan Merriman of Pretty Little Liars fame. Michelle De Long is credited with sending a tape of the young actor to a manager in Los Angeles. Despite only being interested in musical theater, after being introduced to the manager, McFarland transitioned into acting. In her teens, McFarland made regular trips to audition in Los Angeles. She and her family moved to Los Angeles permanently in 2008.

Career

Her first major role came in the form of an independent film, An American Crime, starring Elliot Page and Catherine Keener. She has appeared in isolated episodes on various TV series, including Gilmore Girls, ER, Criminal Minds, and Law and Order: SVU. She was a main character of the crime drama series Lie to Me on Fox, portraying Emily Lightman for all three seasons from 2009 to 2011. McFarland also had a recurring role in the final two seasons of FX crime drama Sons of Anarchy. McFarland has starred in several horror films, including The Conjuring and Agnes.

Filmography

Notes

References

External links

1991 births
Living people
Actresses from Oklahoma
American child actresses
American film actresses
American television actresses
People from Edmond, Oklahoma
21st-century American actresses